Emeopedus baloghi is a species of beetle in the family Cerambycidae. It was described by Breuning in 1975.

References

Acanthocinini
Beetles described in 1975